Brazilian Journal of Geology (formerly Revista Brasileira de Geociências) is a quarterly peer-reviewed scientific journal published by the Sociedade Brasileira de Geologia, Brazil's main geology society. The journal covers the field of geology and related earth sciences, in Brazil, South America, and Antarctica, including oceanic regions adjacent to these regions. The journal was established in 1971 and articles are published in English and Portuguese. The journal replaced the Boletim da Sociedade Brasileira de Geologia established in 1952.
The journal is sponsored by Petrobras.

References

External links 
 

Geology journals
Geology of South America
Geology of Brazil
Publications established in 1971
Multilingual journals
Open access journals
Quarterly journals
Academic journals published by learned and professional societies of Brazil
English-language journals
Portuguese-language journals